Jamal Rahimov (born 16 September 1987 in Baku) is an Azerbaijani equestrian showjumper. He has represented Azerbaijan twice at the Olympic Games: in 2008 and 2012.

Career
He started show jumping in 1998 in Istanbul. He graduated from The Istanbul International Community School.

He is the first showjumper to represent Azerbaijan in the equestrian events at the Olympic Games.

Personal life
He moved to Istanbul with his family, when he was three. He lives in Belgium.

He is the grandson of Hasan Hasanov, ambassador of Azerbaijan in Poland.

He has a B.A. in Business Management from the Regent's Business School in London. Rahimov fluently speaks Azerbaijani, English, French, Russian and Turkish. He has a good knowledge of Italian and Portuguese too.

Olympics 2008 
At the 2008 Olympic Games Rahimov competed in the individual jumping. He ended at the second qualification round because he fell from his horse, Ionesco de Brekka who was bought by Rahimov for 1,96 mln euro.

Olympics 2012 
At the 2012 Olympic Games Rahimov competed in the same event. He ended at the second qualification round too.

References

External links 
 Profile at sports-reference.com
 Official site
 Profile at ijrc.org

Azerbaijani male equestrians
Olympic equestrians of Azerbaijan
1987 births
Equestrians at the 2008 Summer Olympics
Equestrians at the 2012 Summer Olympics
Living people
Sportspeople from Baku